Sky Ball, also spelled Skyball, is an unincorporated community and former city in Blount County, Alabama, United States.
Sky Ball has been noted for its unusual place name.

References

Unincorporated communities in Blount County, Alabama
Unincorporated communities in Alabama